Ethmia chalcogramma is a moth in the family Depressariidae. It is found in Bolivia.

The ground color of the forewings is white, largely replaced by gray-brown markings. The ground color of the hindwings is white, becoming brownish at the distal margins.

References

Moths described in 1973
chalcogramma